A Call For Arms is a short propaganda film made for the British Ministry of Information in 1940. It was directed by Brian Desmond Hurst and starred Jean Gillie and Rene Ray as two 'nudes' (showgirls) who do their bit for the war effort by going to work in munition factories. It was co-written by a Sgt. Terence Young who worked for Hurst on many projects before, during and after World War II.

Plot
The film opens with the two showgirls coming across a collapsed munitions worker outside the theatre door. "Twelve hour shifts take it out of some of these young 'uns" observes a nearby news-seller. Alongside a billboard gets the message across "Latest War News. Bigger Arms, Speed up. Go For It". The plots follows one of the showgirls signing up at the Labour Exchange for munitions work and tracks her working day. Seeing her friend exhausted the other showgirl signs up. "We've got to win the war you know".

Cast
 Jean Gillie as Irene
 Rene Ray as Joan
 Kathleen Harrison as Mrs. James

References

External links
 Watch A Call to Arms free here

1940 films
British World War II propaganda shorts
Films directed by Brian Desmond Hurst
British short documentary films
1940 documentary films
British black-and-white films
1940s short documentary films